Matthias Guggenberger (born 24 September 1984, in Innsbruck) is an Austrian skeleton racer who has competed since 2005. His best Skeleton World Cup finish was 3rd at Königssee 
He won silver at the world championship 2016 in Igls (Team).
2018-2022 he was coach of Martins and Tomass Dukurs and Janine Flock. The won 9 globes at the world cup, 9 medals at european championships and three world championship medals. Now he is coaching the british skeleton team. 

He qualified for the 2010 and 2014 and 2018 Winter Olympics, finishing 8th and 14th respectively.

External links
 
 
 

1984 births
Austrian male skeleton racers
Living people
Olympic skeleton racers of Austria
Skeleton racers at the 2010 Winter Olympics
Skeleton racers at the 2014 Winter Olympics
Skeleton racers at the 2018 Winter Olympics
Sportspeople from Innsbruck
20th-century Austrian people
21st-century Austrian people